James Trinnick (13 December 1853 – 12 July 1928) was an Australian cricketer. He played six first-class cricket matches for Victoria between 1880 and 1887.

See also
 List of Victoria first-class cricketers

References

External links
 

1853 births
1928 deaths
Australian cricketers
Victoria cricketers
People from Kingsbridge